Nakasuji Station is a HRT station on Astram Line, located in 2-6-17, Nakasuji, Asaminami-ku, Hiroshima.

Platforms

Connections
█ Astram Line
●Nishihara — ●Nakasuji — ●Furuichi

Bus services connections

Local bus
Hiroden Bus

Around station
Bus Terminal
Hiroshima City Asaminami Ward Office
JA Hiroshima
San'yō Expressway
Japan National Route 54 (Gion Shindo)

History
Opened on August 20, 1994.

See also
Astram Line
Hiroshima Rapid Transit

References

Nakasuji Station